Tranquility Park is a municipal park in Houston, Texas.

History
Tranquility Park is a park located in Downtown Houston, Texas, between Walker and Rusk Streets, and west of Smith Street, with the United States federal courts building for the Southern District of Texas on one side and Houston City Hall on the other. It takes its name, notably differing in spelling, from the Sea of Tranquility, where man first landed on the Moon during the Apollo 11 mission on July 20, 1969. First opening to visitors in the summer of 1979, Tranquility Park was officially dedicated on the tenth anniversary of the historic lunar landing. On bronze plaques placed along the main entrance, the first words transmitted by Neil Armstrong from the Moon, "Houston, Tranquility Base here. The Eagle has landed," are written in 15 languages. A replica of one of the footprints left on the Moon by Neil Armstrong is also on display inside the park.

A two-block-long oasis of water and walkways, the mounds and depressions throughout the park are meant to represent the cratered lunar surface, and the park's 32-level Wortham Fountain features towering stainless steel cylinders designed to resemble the Apollo's rocket boosters. Each year, Tranquillity Park hosts many city functions, art shows, and events such as the Children's Festival and the Houston International Festival. The park is also popular with downtown office workers seeking a shady spot to picnic during their lunch hour. In the northern part of the park, actually a smaller park across the street, there are two memorials, one for each Space Shuttle disaster.

Construction of Tranquility Park was completed in 1979, implementing the plan of Charles Tapley and Jeffrey Lunow of Charles Tapley Associates.

See also
 Buzz Aldrin
 Tranquility Base
 Lunar Module Eagle
 Apollo 11 in popular culture

References 

https://www.visithoustontexas.com/listings/tranquility-park/20278/

Parks in Houston
1979 establishments in Texas
Cultural depictions of Neil Armstrong
Apollo 11
Downtown Houston